, the number of Syrians in Saudi Arabia is estimated to be around 700,000 - 2,500,000  and consists mainly of temporary foreign workers. According to the United Nations High Commissioner for Refugees' representative for the Persian Gulf region, Syrian nationals are referred to as "Arab brothers and sisters in distress".  Saudi Arabia does not consider Syrians as refugees. They are provided access to education and healthcare, and allowed to take up jobs like other expats

Refugees
, the flow of refugees to the European Union has increased significantly, and there is a rise in criticism of some Muslim nations for allegedly accepting few refugees. The Syrian Civil War forced millions to flee their homes in search of safety. Saudi Arabia, as a rich country, was heavily criticized for not offering land to Syrian refugees – it only offers resettlement for asylum-seekers whose families already reside in Saudi Arabia.

Total number
The CIA World Factbook estimated that , foreign nationals living in Saudi Arabia made up about 21% of the population. Total number of Syrians in Saudi Arabia was 100,000 before the start of Syrian Civil War.

Saudi Arabia, like all the other Arab states of the Persian Gulf, is not a signatory to the 1951 United Nations Refugee Convention, which mandates member states to protect refugees within their country. However, according to a Saudi official, Saudi Arabia has issued residency permits to 100,000 Syrians. On the other hand, the BBC claims, "Most successful cases are Syrians already in the Gulf states extending their stays, or those entering because they have family there," and, "No Syrians claiming asylum have been taken in by Saudi Arabia or other wealthy Gulf countries."

Syrians in Saudi Arabia include migrants from Syria to Saudi Arabia and their descendants. The number of Syrians in Saudi Arabia (referred to as "Arab brothers and sisters in distress") was estimated to be at around 2,500,000 people in August 2015 and consisted mainly of temporary foreign workers. However, a UNHCR official stated that the number of Syrians in Saudi Arabia was around 700,000.

Conflicting versions
Saudi foreign ministry officials claim that the nation has received nearly 2.5 million Syrians since 2011. However, the BBC reports that Saudi Arabia has let in 500,000 Syrian refugees since 2011, while Arab News reported that Saudi Arabia was already home to 500,000 Syrians Saudi Arabia claims to have granted 100,000 Syrians residency. An official from Saudi Arabia's Ministry of Foreign Affairs stated that Saudi Arabia "made it a point not to deal with them as 'refugees'."

The Huffington Post has criticized the international community for saying that Saudi Arabia has taken no refugees. The newspaper claimed that outlets in the US have exploited a technicality used by the UN to count Syrian refugees, and that it is more plausible that 500,000 Syrian refugees are currently in Saudi Arabia.

Notable Syrians in Saudi Arabia
Ali Al-Tantawi, an Islamic scholar and a literary figure.
Nadia Awni Sakati, a pediatrician who described three rare disorders in children
Medhat Sheikh el-Ard, king Abdulaziz's doctor and a diplomat.
Maarouf al-Dawalibi, a Syrian politician and twice the prime minister of Syria. He also served as an adviser to several Saudi kings.
Muhammad Ali Al-Sabuni, a notable Muslim scholar
Muhammad Dhiyauddin Al-Sabuni, also known as the poet of Taibah
Abdelrazaq Al Hussain
Ahmad Deeb
Jehad Al-Hussain
Mahmoud Maowas
Mohamad Hamwi
Mohammed Estanbeli
Mohannad Ibrahim
Muhammad Surur
Omar Al Soma
Raja Rafe
Wael Ayan
Yahya Hawwa

See also
Saudi Arabia–Syria relations
Syrian diaspora
Refugees of the Syrian Civil War

References

Arabs in Saudi Arabia
Ethnic groups in Saudi Arabia
 
Saudi Arabia
Saudi Arabia